Konrad Kurt Ladstätter (born 2 May 1968) is an Italian former alpine skier who competed in the 1992 Winter Olympics.

Career
Two of the most important victories in Konrad Kurt Ladstätter's career, the junior world title won in Bad Kleinkirchheim in 1986 and the Italian title won ten years later, in 1996. Both successes in slalom.

References

External links
 

1968 births
Living people
Italian male alpine skiers
Olympic alpine skiers of Italy
Alpine skiers at the 1992 Winter Olympics
Germanophone Italian people
People from Olang
Alpine skiers of Gruppo Sportivo Forestale
Sportspeople from Südtirol